In mathematics and statistics, in the context of Markov processes, the Kolmogorov equations, including Kolmogorov forward equations and Kolmogorov backward equations, are a pair of systems of differential equations that describe the time evolution of the process's distribution. This article, as opposed to the article titled Kolmogorov equations, focuses on the scenario where we have a continuous-time Markov chain (so the state space  is countable).

The equations

The Kolmogorov forward equations read 

 , 

where  is the transition rate matrix (also known as the generator matrix),

while the Kolmogorov backward equations are 

 

The functions  are continuous and differentiable in both time arguments. They represent the
probability that the system that was in state  at time  jumps to state  at some later time . The continuous quantities  satisfy

Background

The original derivation of the equations by Kolmogorov starts with the Chapman–Kolmogorov equation (Kolmogorov called it fundamental equation) for time-continuous and differentiable Markov processes on a finite, discrete state space. Also, adequate limit properties for the derivatives are assumed. Feller derives the equations under slightly different conditions, starting with the concept of purely discontinuous Markov process and then formulating them for more general state spaces. Feller proves the existence  of solutions of probabilistic character to the Kolmogorov forward equations and Kolmogorov backward equations under natural conditions.

Relation with the generating function

Still in the discrete state case, letting  and assuming that the system initially is found in state
, the Kolmogorov forward equations describe an initial-value problem for finding the probabilities of the process, given the quantities . We write  where , then

Letting

After some manipulations, the system of equations reads,

History 
A brief historical note can be found at Kolmogorov equations.

See also 
 Kolmogorov equations
 Master equation (in physics and chemistry), a synonym of "Kolmogorov equations" for many continuous-time Markov chains appearing in physics and chemistry.

References 

Markov processes